Demequina flava is a Gram-positive bacterium from the genus Demequina which has been isolated from marine sediments from the Rishiri Island in Japan.

References

Micrococcales
Bacteria described in 2013